Veit von Würzburg (1519–1577) was the Prince-Bishop of Bamberg from 1561 to 1577.

Biography

Veit von Würzburg was born in Rothenkirchen, now incorporated into Pressig, on 15 June 1519.

He was elected Prince-Bishop of Bamberg on 22 April 1561, with Pope Pius IV confirming the appointment on 19 November 1561.  He was ordained as a priest in 1566.  Friedrich Lichtenauer, auxiliary bishop of Bamberg, consecrated him as a bishop on 28 June 1562.

He died on 8 July 1577 and is buried in Michaelsberg Abbey, Bamberg.

References

1519 births
1577 deaths
Prince-Bishops of Bamberg